Wood is the main fuel for cooking and other domestic requirements. It is not surprising that population pressure has had an adverse effect on the indigenous forests. By 1980 only about 16 percent of the land was forested, and forests had all but disappeared from the densely populated and intensively cultivated deltaic plain. Aid organizations in the mid-1980s began looking into the possibility of stimulating small-scale forestry to restore a resource for which there was no affordable substitute. Bangladesh Forest Research Institute (BFRI) is the government organization under Ministry of Environment, Forest and Climate Change for research in this sector which was established in 1955 at Sholoshahar, Chittagong city.

The largest areas of forest are in the Chittagong Hill Tracts and the Sundarbans. Domesticated elephants are still used to haul logs. The Sundarbans, a tidal mangrove forest covering nearly  along the Bay of Bengal, is the source of timber used for a variety of purposes, including pulp for the domestic paper industry, poles for electric power distribution, and leaves for thatching for dwellings. The total percentage of forests are 10.98%.

Forestry universities 
There are three universities in Bangladesh where a student can enroll for an undergraduate degree in forestry. Among them the Institute of Forestry and Environmental Sciences under Chittagong University offers undergraduate and graduate degrees both in Forestry and in Environmental Sciences. This is the premier institute for Forestry education in Bangladesh. The three universities of Bangladesh offering undergraduate and graduate degree in Forestry are:

References

 
Economy of Bangladesh